Hardwick Township is a township in Warren County, in the U.S. state of New Jersey. As of the 2020 United States census, the township's population was 1,598, a decrease of 98 (−5.8%) from the 2010 census count of 1,696, which in turn reflected an increase of 232 (+15.8%) from the 1,464 counted in the 2000 census.

History
Hardwick Township was created around 1713 through a royal patent. The township was created by Royal charter on January 22, 1750, from Greenwich Township when the area was part of Morris County. It became part of the newly created Sussex County on June 8, 1753. Parts of Hardwick Township were taken on November 11, 1782, to form Independence Township. Hardwick Township was incorporated as a township by an act of the New Jersey Legislature on February 21, 1798. On November 20, 1824, most of Hardwick Township was transferred to form part of Warren County, with the remainder staying in Sussex County as parts of Green Township and Stillwater Township, which were both created as of December 27, 1824. Frelinghuysen Township was created March 7, 1848, from portions of the township. The township was named for Philip Yorke, 1st Earl of Hardwicke.

Pahaquarry Township was dissolved and absorbed by Hardwick Township on July 2, 1997. Pahaquarry Township had been created on March 14, 1825, and received its name from the word "Pahaquarra", which was a derivation of the Native American word Pahaqualong used by the Lenape meaning "termination of two mountains" (describing the mountain or mountainous area that was the area's southern border) or "the place between the mountains beside the waters".

Geography

According to the U.S. Census Bureau, the township had a total area of 38.94 square miles (100.85 km2), including 37.53 square miles (97.19 km2) of land and 1.42 square miles (3.66 km2) of water (3.63%). The defunct Pahaquarry section of the Township which borders the Delaware River is located in the Minisink Valley that extends from the Delaware Water Gap north to Port Jervis, New York.

Unincorporated communities, localities and place names located partially or completely within the township include Bass Lake, Franklin Grove, Hardwick, Hardwick Center, Millbrook, Newbakers Corner, Sand Pond, Squares Corner and White Pond.

Sunfish Pond is a  glacial lake surrounded by a  hardwood forest located on the Kittatinny Ridge within Worthington State Forest, adjacent to the Delaware Water Gap National Recreation Area. The Appalachian Trail runs alongside the western and northern edges of the lake, which was created by the Wisconsin Glacier during the last ice age. The lake was declared a National Natural Landmark in January 1970.

Camp Ralph S. Mason is a YMCA, established in 1900, that covers  adjacent to the Delaware Water Gap National Recreation Area that serves approximately 800 campers in its summer camp programs and 7,000 participants at its outdoor center.

The Pahaquarry Copper Mine is an abandoned copper mine. Active mining was attempted for brief periods during the mid-eighteenth, mid-nineteenth, and early twentieth centuries but was never successful. The site is administered by the National Park Service.

Hardwick Township borders the municipalities of Blairstown, Frelinghuysen Township, and Knowlton Township in Warren County; and Stillwater Township and Walpack Township in Sussex County.

Demographics

The township's economic data, like all of Warren County, is included by the U.S. Census Bureau as part of the Allentown-Bethlehem-Easton, PA-NJ Metropolitan Statistical Area.

2010 census

The Census Bureau's 2006–2010 American Community Survey showed that (in 2010 inflation-adjusted dollars) median household income was $96,094 (with a margin of error of +/− $6,827) and the median family income was $105,469 (+/− $14,654). Males had a median income of $77,045 (+/− $8,432) versus $46,667 (+/− $3,953) for females. The per capita income for the borough was $38,377 (+/− $5,353). About 3.0% of families and 3.5% of the population were below the poverty line, including 6.3% of those under age 18 and none of those age 65 or over.

2000 census
As of the 2000 United States census there were 1,464 people, 502 households, and 410 families residing in the township. The population density was 40.1 people per square mile (15.5/km2). There were 530 housing units at an average density of 14.5 per square mile (5.6/km2). The racial makeup of the township was 97.06% White, 0.61% African American, 0.07% Native American, 0.41% Asian, 0.89% from other races, and 0.96% from two or more races. Hispanic or Latino of any race were 2.32% of the population.

There were 502 households, out of which 38.6% had children under the age of 18 living with them, 74.3% were married couples living together, 5.6% had a female householder with no husband present, and 18.3% were non-families. 13.9% of all households were made up of individuals, and 5.2% had someone living alone who was 65 years of age or older. The average household size was 2.85 and the average family size was 3.15.

In the township the population was spread out, with 26.6% under the age of 18, 5.2% from 18 to 24, 29.1% from 25 to 44, 29.5% from 45 to 64, and 9.6% who were 65 years of age or older. The median age was 39 years. For every 100 females, there were 99.7 males. For every 100 females age 18 and over, there were 95.1 males.

The median income for a household in the township was $72,167, and the median income for a family was $76,111. Males had a median income of $56,000 versus $31,875 for females. The per capita income for the township was $30,038. About 0.5% of families and 2.6% of the population were below the poverty line, including 0.5% of those under age 18 and 2.2% of those age 65 or over.

Government

Local government 
Hardwick Township is governed under the Township form of New Jersey municipal government, one of 141 municipalities (of the 564) statewide that use this form, the second-most commonly used form of government in the state. The governing body is comprised of a three-member Township Committee, whose members are elected directly by the voters at-large in partisan elections to serve three-year terms of office on a staggered basis, with one seat coming up for election each year as part of the November general election in a three-year cycle. At an annual reorganization meeting, the Township Committee selects one of its members to serve as Mayor and another as Deputy Mayor.

 members of the Hardwick Township Committee are Mayor Chris Jacksic (R), term on committee ends December 31, 2024; term as mayor ends 2023), Deputy Mayor Nichole L. Meuse (R, term on committee ends 2025; term as deputy mayor ends 2023) and John C. Lovell Jr. (R, 2023).

Federal, state, and county representation
Hardwick Township is located in the 7th Congressional District and is part of New Jersey's 24th state legislative district. 

Prior to the 2011 reapportionment following the 2010 Census, Hardwick Township had been in the 23rd state legislative district.

Politics
As of March 2011, there were a total of 1,097 registered voters in Hardwick Township, of which 195 (17.8% vs. 21.5% countywide) were registered as Democrats, 480 (43.8% vs. 35.3%) were registered as Republicans and 422 (38.5% vs. 43.1%) were registered as Unaffiliated. There were no voters registered to other parties. Among the township's 2010 Census population, 64.7% (vs. 62.3% in Warren County) were registered to vote, including 86.0% of those ages 18 and over (vs. 81.5% countywide).

In the 2012 presidential election, Republican Mitt Romney received 446 votes (59.9% vs. 56.0% countywide), ahead of Democrat Barack Obama with 267 votes (35.8% vs. 40.8%) and other candidates with 18 votes (2.4% vs. 1.7%), among the 745 ballots cast by the township's 1,123 registered voters, for a turnout of 66.3% (vs. 66.7% in Warren County). In the 2008 presidential election, Republican John McCain received 473 votes (57.9% vs. 55.2% countywide), ahead of Democrat Barack Obama with 310 votes (37.9% vs. 41.4%) and other candidates with 17 votes (2.1% vs. 1.6%), among the 817 ballots cast by the township's 1,075 registered voters, for a turnout of 76.0% (vs. 73.4% in Warren County). In the 2004 presidential election, Republican George W. Bush received 536 votes (65.7% vs. 61.0% countywide), ahead of Democrat John Kerry with 272 votes (33.3% vs. 37.2%) and other candidates with 5 votes (0.6% vs. 1.3%), among the 816 ballots cast by the township's 1,019 registered voters, for a turnout of 80.1% (vs. 76.3% in the whole county).

In the 2013 gubernatorial election, Republican Chris Christie received 72.9% of the vote (299 cast), ahead of Democrat Barbara Buono with 24.9% (102 votes), and other candidates with 2.2% (9 votes), among the 427 ballots cast by the township's 1,141 registered voters (17 ballots were spoiled), for a turnout of 37.4%. In the 2009 gubernatorial election, Republican Chris Christie received 343 votes (61.4% vs. 61.3% countywide), ahead of Democrat Jon Corzine with 151 votes (27.0% vs. 25.7%), Independent Chris Daggett with 46 votes (8.2% vs. 9.8%) and other candidates with 16 votes (2.9% vs. 1.5%), among the 559 ballots cast by the township's 1,065 registered voters, yielding a 52.5% turnout (vs. 49.6% in the county).

Education
For kindergarten through sixth grade, public school students attend Blairstown Elementary School in Blairstown Township as part of the Blairstown Township School District. The Hardwick Township Board of Education was dissolved and merged into the Blairstown district as of July 1, 2009. The tax levies for the 2009–2010 year were left unchanged, with the tax levy for subsequent years apportioned based 78.8% on enrollment and 21.2% on the equalized value of property on the two municipalities. As of the 2018–19 school year, the district, comprised of one school, had an enrollment of 466 students and 46.7 classroom teachers (on an FTE basis), for a student–teacher ratio of 10.0:1.

Students in seventh through twelfth grades for public school attend the North Warren Regional High School in Blairstown, a public secondary high school that also serves students from the townships of Blairstown, Frelinghuysen and Knowlton. As of the 2018–19 school year, the high school had an enrollment of 799 students and 77.6 classroom teachers (on an FTE basis), for a student–teacher ratio of 10.3:1. Seats on the high school district's nine-member board of education are allocated based on the population of the constituent municipalities, with one seat allocated to Hardwick Township.

Students from the township and from all of Warren County are eligible to attend Ridge and Valley Charter School in Frelinghuysen Township (for grades K–8, with Hardwick residents granted admissions priority) or Warren County Technical School in Washington borough (for 9–12), with special education services provided by local districts supplemented throughout the county by the Warren County Special Services School District in Oxford Township (for Pre-K–12).

Transportation

The only major roads that pass through are County Route 521 in the eastern part and Interstate 80 in the very west. The portion of I-80 also includes part of the Delaware Water Gap Toll Bridge which connects to Pennsylvania.

Old Mine Road, a scenic road that runs along the Delaware River, is said to be among the oldest roads in the Northeast used for the business purposes. It originates in Hardwick at I-80 and continues to the northeast into Walpack Township.

Popular culture

The original Friday the 13th movie was filmed at Hardwick's local Boy Scout Camp, No-Be-Bo-Sco.

Notable people

People who were born in, residents of, or otherwise closely associated with Hardwick Township include:

 John Linn (1763–1821), member of the United States House of Representatives from New Jersey from 1817 to 1821
 Benjamin Lundy (1789–1839), Quaker abolitionist
 Lou Reed (1942–2013), rock performer

References

External links

Hardwick Township Official Website

 
1750 establishments in New Jersey
Delaware Water Gap National Recreation Area
New Jersey District Factor Group none
New Jersey populated places on the Delaware River
Populated places established in 1750
Township form of New Jersey government
Townships in Warren County, New Jersey